Sir Frederick Michael Wells, 1st Baronet (11 March 1884 – 13 September 1966) was Lord Mayor of London for 1947 to 1948.

See also 
Wells baronets

References 
https://www.ukwhoswho.com/view/10.1093/ww/9780199540891.001.0001/ww-9780199540884-e-55224

1884 births
1966 deaths
Knights Bachelor
Baronets in the Baronetage of the United Kingdom
20th-century lord mayors of London
Sheriffs of the City of London